The 1974–75 Iraqi National Clubs First Division was the first edition of the competition since the Iraq Football Association (IFA) founded it as the country's first nationwide league of clubs, replacing the Iraqi National First Division that had been established one year prior for clubs and institutions. Al-Tayaran (now known as Al-Quwa Al-Jawiya) won the title.

Changes from previous season 
Iraq's 16 top division teams were reduced to 10 clubs (names highlighted in bold) for the 1974–75 season.

League table

Results

Season statistics

Top scorers

Hat-tricks 

Notes
5 Player scored 5 goals

References

External links
 Iraq Football Association

Iraqi Premier League seasons
Iraq
1